Oneonta Downtown Historic District is a national historic district located at Oneonta in Otsego County, New York.  It encompasses 64 contributing buildings and one contributing site.  It encompasses the city's intact commercial and civic core and includes commercial buildings, six churches, the city's historic civil buildings, a few industrial buildings, and a small park.  The district includes several separately listed buildings: the Masonic Temple, Old Post Office, Municipal Building, Ford Block, and Oneonta Theatre.

It was listed on the National Register of Historic Places in 2003.

References

Historic districts on the National Register of Historic Places in New York (state)
Greek Revival architecture in New York (state)
Italianate architecture in New York (state)
Historic districts in Otsego County, New York
National Register of Historic Places in Otsego County, New York